Pentila abraxas, the three-dot pentila, is a butterfly in the family Lycaenidae. It is found in Guinea, Sierra Leone, Liberia and western Ivory Coast. The habitat consists of forests.

References

Butterflies described in 1851
Poritiinae